Zir Anbar-e Zivdar (also Romanized as Zīr Anbār-e Zīvdār; also known as Zīr Anbār) is a village in Afrineh Rural District, Mamulan District, Pol-e Dokhtar County, Lorestan Province, Iran. At the 2006 census, its population was 134, in 28 families.

References 

Towns and villages in Pol-e Dokhtar County